Salgado Filho is a municipality in Brazil.

Salgado Filho may also refer to:
Salgado Filho, Santa Maria
Salgado Filho International Airport
Senador Salgado Filho
Joaquim Pedro Salgado Filho